Himalayan maple is a common name for several species of maple tree native to the Himalaya region:
 Acer caesium
 Acer campbellii
 Acer oblongum